KWMF (1380 AM) is a radio station broadcasting a Spanish religious format and licensed in Pleasanton, Texas, United States. The station is currently owned by Virgen De Guadalupe Global Communications, LLC.

History
The station was assigned call sign KFNI on 1999-05-06. On 2007-03-30, the station changed its call sign to KAJG and then on 2007-04-09 to the current KWMF.

References

External links

Catholic radio stations
WMF
1999 establishments in Texas
WMF
Radio stations established in 1999
Catholic Church in Texas
Atascosa County, Texas